Banderilla is a diminutive meaning small flag (bandera) in the Spanish language and may refer to :

"Banderilla" (in the English language) most often refers to the colorfully decorated and barbed sticks used in bullfighting, as illustrated on this page
Banderilla may also refer to a type of Spanish tapas (appetizers) mounted on a toothpick
In Mexico, a corn dog is known as a banderilla
Las Banderillas, rising to 1993 meters above sea level, the highest mountain in the Segura de la Sierra, Spain
Banderilla, Veracruz, a municipality in the State of Veracruz, Mexico
 The plant Salvia splendens, which has bright red flowers, is sometimes known as a Banderilla